The Hunter–Dulin Building (also known as the California Commercial Wool Building or 111 Sutter Street) is a class A office building located at 111 Sutter Street in San Francisco, California.

Description and history
The building was listed on the National Register of Historic Places on April 17, 1997. The building was totally restored and renovated between 1999 and 2001.

The building served as the West Coast headquarters for the National Broadcasting Company from 1927 to 1942; the executive offices were located on the 21st floor and the studio offices were located on the 22nd. The 22nd floor was formerly occupied by peer-to-peer lending firm Prosper Marketplace. 111 Sutter Street was also the fictional location of the "Spade & Archer" detective agency in Dashell Hammett's  famous 1930 book, "The Maltese Falcon". According to Hammett, Sam Spade's office was located on the 5th floor.

References

Further reading
 

Office buildings completed in 1926
Skyscraper office buildings in San Francisco
National Register of Historic Places in San Francisco
Gothic Revival architecture in California
Commercial buildings on the National Register of Historic Places in California
Financial District, San Francisco